The Seven Fabulous Wonders is a fantasy series by Katherine Roberts currently comprising seven novels. The novels are based on the Seven Wonders of the Ancient World.

Works included 

The Great Pyramid Robbery (2001)
The Babylon Game (2002)
The Amazon Temple Quest (2002)
The Mausoleum Murder (2003)
The Olympic Conspiracy (2004)
The Colossus Crisis (2005)
The Cleopatra Curse (2006)

External links 
Katherine Roberts homepage
The Great Pyramid Robbery page on Katherine Roberts homepage

Novel series
Novels set in ancient Egypt